The 2014 SEABA Cup was the qualifying event in the SEABA subzone for the 2014 FIBA Asia Cup. The games were held from May 21 to 23 in Batam, Riau Islands Province, in Indonesia.

Automatically, only one spot is allotted for SEABA but due to the Philippines' runner-up finish in the 2013 FIBA Asia Championship, the subzone was awarded another slot, thus SEABA will now have two spots which will be contested by three SEABA teams.

Singapore won their first international title ever after posting their second win in as many games in the three-game round-robin tournament to clinch the title in the 2014 SEABA Cup. Singapore and hosts Indonesia represented SEABA subzone in the 2014 FIBA Asia Cup, along with the Philippines that was invited as a wildcard after the Gulf subzone representative withdrew from the competition.

Round robin

Final standings

Awards

References

 2014 SEABA Stankovic Cup Fixtures/Results

2014
International basketball competitions hosted by Indonesia
2013–14 in Asian basketball
2013–14 in Malaysian basketball
2013–14 in Indonesian basketball
2013–14 in Singaporean basketball